Laukoa "Koa" Santos (born September 21, 1999) is an American soccer player who plays as a defender for USL Championship club Loudoun United FC.

Career

Youth
Santos played academy soccer for his local soccer club Kona Crush Academy. Concurrently, Laukoa played high school soccer for Kealakehe High School in Kona, Hawaii. With Kealakehe, Laukoa served as the team's captain, being named Three-time Big Island Interscholastic Federation Player of the Year, Four-time Big Island Interscholastic, First-team all-state honoree (2016–17), and All-Hawaii team (2016–17). During his career with Kealakehe High School Santos recorded 87 goals and 48 assists during his prep career.

College 
Ahead of the 2017 NCAA Division I men's soccer season, Laukoa signed a National Letter of Intent to play collegiately for San Diego State University. Laukoa is the first men's soccer player from the State of Hawaii to play in the Pac-12. Laukoa would go on to red shirt his first season at San Diego and make his official debut during the 2018 season. On September 24, 2018, Laukoa scored his first collegiate goal against UNLV. Laukoa would finish his collegiate career with 58 appearances, scoring two goals and tallying three assists. Santos was named to the Pac-12 Academic Honor Roll on three consecutive seasons from 2019 to 2021.

Amateur 
While at college, Santos appeared in the National Premier Soccer League with ASC San Diego during their 2018 season, making two regular season appearances. In 2021, Santos played with USL League Two Portland Timbers U23s, scoring two goals in ten appearances.

Professional
On February 22, 2022, Santos signed with Major League Soccer club Charlotte FC ahead of their inaugural season. On April 17, 2022, Santos was loaned to USL League One club Charlotte Independence and started for the team the same day in a 2–1 win over Northern Colorado Hailstorm.

Santos joined USL Championship club Loudoun United in January 2023.

Honors 

 First men's soccer player from state of Hawaii to play in the Pac-12
 Three-time Big Island Interscholastic Federation Player of the Year
 Four-time Big Island Interscholastic Federation first-team selection
 First-team all-state honoree (2016–17)
 All-Hawaii team (2016–17)
 Pac-12 All Academic (2017–21)
 Led Portland Timbers U23 to a Western Conference Title (2021)

References

1999 births
Living people
American soccer players
Association football defenders
Charlotte FC players
Charlotte Independence players
Loudoun United FC players
National Premier Soccer League players
Portland Timbers U23s players
San Diego State Aztecs men's soccer players
Soccer players from Hawaii
USL League One players
USL League Two players
People from Kailua-Kona, Hawaii
Major League Soccer players